Dorothy Crater is the largest known impact basin on Pluto's moon Charon. The crater was discovered by the New Horizons space probe in 2015 during its flyby of Pluto and its moons. It was named after Dorothy Gale from the novel The Wonderful Wizard of Oz. The crater is located near Charon's north pole, and overlaps the edge of Mordor Macula.

See also
 List of geological features on Charon
Dorothy (Venusian crater)

References

Impact craters on Charon
New Horizons